Aranmanai 2() is a 2016 Indian Tamil-language comedy horror film written and directed by Sundar C. The film stars Sundar himself, Trisha, Hansika Motwani, Siddharth, Poonam Bajwa, Soori, Kovai Sarala, Manobala, Chitra Lakshmanan and Radharavi and Vaibhav Reddy. The second installment in the Aranmanai (film series), the film released on 29 January 2016.The film revolves Murali (Siddharth) returns to his ancestral home along with his fiancée Anitha (Trisha) when his father lands in a coma under mysterious circumstances. His life takes a turn when he uncovers his family's dark secrets with Ravi (Sundar C).The film received mixed to positive reviews from critics.

Plot
The movie starts with the Amman statue, which was guarding the village against evil spirits and negative energy, being moved into an underground room during the temple's renovation. At a graveyard somewhere close to the temple, a group of tantric practitioners capitalise on the Amman being made dormant to awaken evil spirits for black magic purposes. During the ritual, they inadvertently release a demonic entity that they could not contain. The evil spirit then leaves the graveyard in the form of a cloud and moves into the village. The village mendicant-holy man notices the evil spirit and chases after it, but could not prevent it from entering the titular palace. Being mute, his pleadings to warn the palace owner are ignored. Later that night, the spirit attacks the owner who then falls and goes into a coma. His elder son Ramesh arrives with his wife Sandhya and their son Suresh. Together with them are his younger brother, Murali and his fiancée Anitha. Devadas arrives as well, in disguise as his father, Sandhu Bondu Naadimuthu who was a doctor and had contact with the landowners.

One night the family driver is killed. After a few nights, Suresh does crazy things and says that someone is telling him to do so. Also Murali sees his father being elevated above the bed and gets scared. Anitha, who also sees these things, decides to call her brother, Ravi. One night Ravi sees Suresh drowning and rescues him. He initially suspects Manju, who was hired by the family as a nurse for Murali's father, but he soon realizes it is not her since she has a different agenda. After that, he sets up cameras around the house. A couple of nights later the elder brother goes missing and Ravi sees it. With the cameras, he is able to identify the spirit that is causing havoc. Murali identifies her as Maya, his younger sister.

Maya was loved by all, especially by her father and Murali. She was also the owner of Maya Granites shown in the song Maya Maya. On the day before her marriage, she eloped with one of the workers' son and the whole family was shocked and felt disgraced. Three years later in Bangalore, when Murali sees that she is pregnant, he passes the good news to his father and brother as they arrive at their house. Their father asks Maya to come back home to which she agrees. On the day she was supposed to arrive, Maya didn't show up, and Murali thought she had changed her mind. Later Ravi tells that it's not true. Maya and her husband got off a stop earlier since her elder brother wanted them to arrive home safely. While travelling in a Jeep on the way to their palace, Maya's husband was stabbed by the driver. After that, he instructed Maya to go into hiding. But this plan failed when Maya's father arrived and told her to drink poison since she disgraced her family's name and status by marrying someone who belonged to a lower caste. Maya agrees to her father's words with a condition that her husband's life should be spared. After she drank the poison, Maya's elder brother killed her husband in front of her which made Maya vow that she will end the male generation in her family before her father chokes her to death. Ravi also tells that her primary target is Murali since he told their father and elder brother about her whereabouts and also Suresh. Manju tells that her uncle is a priest and lives near the Kerala border.

Ravi goes with Manju to the priest whose disciples at first refused to offer a helping hand because the priest is just recuperating from myocardial infarction (heart attack). But before they leave, the priest decides to help them and starts the pooja. After a few moments, the priest informs that Maya has possessed someone in the palace and it is revealed to be Anitha. It is also shown that Anitha killed Murali's elder brother and also poisons her father-in-law as an act of revenge, even though he managed to recover from his coma. Ravi decides to find Maya's corpse, while Murali, Suresh, and Manju try to distract Anitha by taking the entire family to a restaurant. Their main goal is to get Anitha's blood and put some holy ink on her hair. They manage to get her blood when she is cutting an apple, and one of the assistants manages to put the ink before getting thrashed by Anitha/Maya. There Anitha goes to the house and tries to kill Murali and Suresh. However, it fails and the priest manages to get Maya out of Anitha. Later Ravi and the priest decide to kill the spirit and the only way is to be possessed by the spirit and stab its own corpse. Ravi manages to do it and completes it but the priest gets chest pain and he tells Murali that their only hope is to go to the Amman Pooja that is happening in their village temple as Amman is their final hope. Murali and Suresh get there with Ravi possessed by Maya trying to stop them. When Ravi is about to kill Murali, Amman uses her powers and prevents Maya's spirit from killing Murali and Suresh. Before she leaves, she sees her brother Murali who sheds tears for what had happened to his beloved sister. Before Maya disappears she smiles at Amman. After this incident, Murali, Suresh and Anitha reunite and Ravi reunites with Manju leaving the Aranmanai in the hands of the caretakers. As everyone leaves the palace, Maya's spirit enters a doll and returns to the palace waiting for the right time to swing back into action. The movie ends with a hint of a sequel.

Cast

Sundar C. as Ravi, Anitha's brother, Manju's love interest, who was lastly possessed by Maya's spirit
Siddharth as Murali, elder Brother of Maya, younger brother of Ramesh, Anitha's fiancée 
Trisha as Anitha, Ravi's sister, Murali's fiancée, who is possessed by Maya's spirit
Hansika Motwani as Maya, the spirit, Arun's wife, Ramesh and Murali's sister, who wants revenge for her husband and her child's death
Poonam Bajwa as Manju, a nurse, Ravi's love interest
Soori as Devadas & Sandhu Bondhu Naadimuthu, Devadas's father
Kovai Sarala as Komalam, Vera Shekar's sister, Sandhu Bondhu Naadimuthu's ex-lover, a servant 
Manobala as Vera Shekar, Komalam's brother, a servant
Vinodhini Vaidyanathan as Sandhya, Murali's sister-in-law and Ramesh's wife, Suresh's mother
 Nithin Manivannan as Suresh, Ramesh's son
Martin Atharv as Munna, Son of the Servant Women (Komalam)
Radha Ravi as Murali, Ramesh, Jr. Murali and Maya's father, who kills Maya and her child
Subbu Panchu as Ramesh, Murali and Maya's brother, Suresh's father, who kills Arun (Maya's Husband)
Raj Kapoor as Driver, who helps to kill Maya, Arun and their child
Chitra Lakshmanan as Ravi and Anitha's father
V. I. S. Jayapalan as Namboothiri, Manju's uncle, who helps Ravi, Murali and Suresh to save them from Maya
 Dhindukal Saravanan as Devadas's assistant
Thalapathy Dinesh as Namboothiri's assistant
Vichu Vishwanath as Namboothiri's assistant
Aadukalam Naren as Mahalingam 
Rahul Thatha as a priest
Vaibhav as Arun, Maya's husband (cameo)
Khushbu in a special appearance for "Amma (the Amman song)"
 Hiphop Tamizha Aadhi as himself in the song "Party with the Pei"

Production
The project's progress was first officially revealed after Trisha had tweeted her involvement in the sequel and revealed that she would star alongside Siddharth. Hansika Motwani subsequently also announced that she would work in Aranmanai 2. Poonam Bajwa was later selected for the role. Soori was selected as a comedian replacing N. Santhanam who was part of first film. Kovai Sarala and Aadukalam Naren were also added to the cast to portray supporting roles. The team began the first schedule in mid-June 2015, with scenes involving Hansika canned.

The film's second schedule was begun in July where portions involving Trisha and Siddarth were shot. A song sequence involving dancers from Kerala and a cast including Siddarth, Trisha, Soori and Kovai Sarala was also canned. The team created a 103 feet statue of the goddess for a song sequence. The principal photography of the film came to an end in mid-November and the post-production work started.

Music

The film's soundtrack album and background score were composed by Hiphop Tamizha. The soundtrack album consists of six tracks. The music rights were purchased by Think Music India. The album was released on 27 December 2015. Independent singer Kaushik Krish (who earlier recorded "Kannala Kannala", also composed by Hiphop Tamizha for Thani Oruvan) announced in September 2015 that he was working on a single track from the album, though his name did not appear on the tracklist.

Release
The promotional song of the film 'Party with the Pei' was released on 10 November 2015 coinciding with Deepavali. The film was announced to be released on 15 January 2016 coinciding with Thai Pongal, however the release date was pushed to 29 January 2016.

The film released on 29 January 2016 on more than 400 screens in Tamil Nadu.

Reception

Critical response
IndiaGlitz.com had rated 3.5/5 by saying "Aranmanai 2 isn't a genius of a story, it dwells mainly on some slapstick humour, the performances of Hansika, Trisha, Kovai Sarala and Soori, and some real good camera & Art work behind the scenes". Times of India rated the film 2.5/5 and wrote "Despite toeing so closely to the original's formula and being equally unpretentious, Aranmanai-2 feels underwhelming. The horror scenes not even remotely scary (though, the visual effects continue to be tacky). The cast and the director seem to be coasting along with a 'people will see this movie no matter what' attitude, and it is this blatant acknowledgement of the film being just a cash grab that is most disappointing". Behindwoods rated the film 2.25/5.0. Sify wrote "Sundar C's Aranmanai 2 is a pucca paisa vasool popcorn entertainer, which is packaged with all the commercial trappings like glamour, slapstick comedy and thrilling moments. Set in a familiar milieu, one can easily predict each and every scene and the film will work big time with common man seeking pure time pass entertainment". Silverscreen wrote "At a time when a younger generation of filmmakers in Kollywood are coming up with well-made horror films like Maya, Pisaasu and Demonte Colony, Aranmanai 2 looks like a grinch in a hip Bengaluru pub. Out of place and awkward".

Box office
The film grossed an excellent amount of 18 crores in its opening weekend in Tamil Nadu, beating its competitor Irudhi Suttru. The film collects 39 crores worldwide and was declared a box office success.

According to the director Sundar C., the film collected more money than its predecessor and was financially successful, despite receiving mixed-to-positive reviews from critics.

Sequel
Sundar also directed the third sequel titled Aranmanai 3. The film stars Sundar C., Arya, Raashi Khanna, Andrea Jeremiah in the lead role, with Sakshi Agarwal, Vivek, Yogi Babu, Sampath Raj, playing supporting roles.

References

External links

2016 films
Indian sequel films
Films directed by Sundar C.
Indian comedy horror films
2010s Tamil-language films
Films scored by Hiphop Tamizha